Warmack is a surname. It may refer to:
 Chance Warmack (born 1991), American football guard
 Dave Warmack (1947–2017), American football coach
 Dwaun Warmack (born c. 1977), American school administrator and university president
 Gregory Warmack (1948–2012), American outsider artist
 H. P. Warmack (1882–1963), American Negro League first baseman and manager
 Sam Warmack (1899–death unknown), American Negro League outfielder